George H. Williston (1818 – January 9, 1881) was an American politician.

Born in Binghamton, New York, he moved to Harmony, Rock County, Wisconsin Territory in 1837. In 1841, he then moved to Janesville, Wisconsin Territory when elected register of deeds. Williston also served on the Janesville Common Council. He served in the Wisconsin Territorial Legislature in 1846 and 1848. He also served in the Wisconsin State Assembly in 1855. He died in Janesville, Wisconsin.

Notes

1818 births
1881 deaths
Politicians from Binghamton, New York
Politicians from Janesville, Wisconsin
Wisconsin city council members
Members of the Wisconsin Territorial Legislature
Members of the Wisconsin State Assembly
19th-century American politicians
People from Harmony, Rock County, Wisconsin